Brian Skyrms (born 1938) is an American philosopher, Distinguished Professor of Logic and Philosophy of Science and Economics at the University of California, Irvine, and a professor of philosophy at Stanford University.  He has worked on problems in the philosophy of science, causation, decision theory, game theory, and the foundations of probability.

Education and career

Skyrms graduated from Lehigh University in 1960 and earned his Ph.D. in philosophy from the University of Pittsburgh in 1964.  He taught at several different universities, before teaching at the University of Illinois, Chicago from 1968 until 1980, when he moved to the University of California, Irvine.

Skyrms is a Fellow of the American Academy of Arts & Sciences and one of two living philosophers (along with Allan Gibbard) to be elected a Fellow of the National Academy of Sciences.

Philosophical work

Most recently, his work has focused on the evolution of social norms using evolutionary game theory.  His two recent books Evolution of the Social Contract  and The Stag Hunt  are both on this topic.  These books use arguments and examples from evolutionary game theory to cover topics of interest to political philosophy, philosophy of social science, philosophy of language, and the philosophy of biology.

Books
Ten Great Ideas about Chance (with Persi Diaconis, Princeton University Press, 2018)
 Social Dynamics, Oxford University Press 2014.
 Signals: Evolution, Learning, and Information, Oxford University Press 2010
 The Stag Hunt and the Evolution of Social Structure, Cambridge University Press 2004
 Evolution of the Social Contract, Cambridge University Press 1996
 The Dynamics of Rational Deliberation, Harvard University Press 1990
 Pragmatics and Empiricism, Yale University Press 1984
 Causal Necessity, Yale University Press 1980
 Choice and Chance: An Introduction to Inductive Logic, Dickenson 1966, 4th ed. Wadsworth 1999. (Translated into German as: Einführung in die induktive Logik, Lang 1989.)

References

External links
 Skyrms' homepage
 Press release regarding his election to the NAS
 

1938 births
Living people
20th-century American philosophers
21st-century American philosophers
American logicians
Economists from California
Game theorists
Lakatos Award winners
Members of the United States National Academy of Sciences
Philosophers of language
Philosophers of science
Philosophers of social science
Probability theorists
Stanford University Department of Philosophy faculty
University of California, Irvine faculty